Florø stadion is a multi-use stadium in the town of Florø in the municipality of Kinn, Vestland, Norway. It is used for football matches, as the home ground of 2. divisjon team Florø SK, and for track and field meets by Florø TIF.

The attendance record at Florø Stadion is 2,710 and was set in the 2016 2. divisjon match against Nest-Sotra on 15 October 2016. Florø won the game 2–0 and secured the team their first ever promotion to the 1. divisjon, the second tier of the Norwegian football league system.

References

External links
Stadionsiden.com

Football venues in Norway
Athletics (track and field) venues in Norway
Sports venues in Vestland
Kinn